Hydromassage is a massage technique which uses water pressure to help alleviate muscle and soft tissue injuries caused by lower back pain, arthritis, chronic and acute pain, neck injuries, TMJD, sports injuries, pregnancy discomforts, Crohn’s disease, insomnia, spondylolysis, multiple sclerosis, lupus, fibromyalgia, tendinitis, and stress management, as well as many other diseases and ailments.

Potential dangers of hydro massage
As with any form of massage, physical therapy, or water activity, certain health conditions can potentially be aggravated by hydro massage, and it may be advised by physicians for those with these conditions to avoid it. Conditions that pose serious risks include the following: 
 Certain types of blood disorders, especially bleeding, bruising, broken or weak capillaries, or any condition in which blood vessels may be compromised
 Neurological symptoms and disorders (also includes systematic diseases) 
 HIV/AIDS
 Infections or communicable diseases
 Skin disorders, such as severe acne, psoriasis, or eczema
 Acute inflammatory responses, such as fever, feelings of excessive heat on any part of the body, loss of function, rash, redness, or swelling
 Injuries, fractures, or open wounds
 Blood pressure disorders (hypertension or hypotension) 
 Heart conditions
 Second or third-degree burns 
 Pregnancy
 Thrombosis or blood clotting disorders
 Spinal conditions and diseases, especially bulging, ruptured, or herniated discs

History of hydro massage 

Hydro massage is a natural remedy that has been known and used for years. The history of hydro therapy goes back as far as ancient Greece, but it was made popular by the Romans, who introduced the benefits of bathing and massage to the countries they conquered. Roman public baths were always recognized as a great source of relaxation, where members of high society and all free people could enjoy the benefits of hot and cold water, as well as a massage.

Modern hydromassage with Tobias Smollett. His 1752 essay On the External Use of Water described pumped water as useful in the treatment of "hysterical disorders, obstruction of the menses and all cases in which it was necessary to make a revulsion from the head and to invite the juices downward". Since the 1960s, hydro massage has been gaining popularity. Every year, more advanced hydromassage equipment appears, making it easily available to many people, as these tools and equipment are now accessible for home use.

Today, the hydromassage is  still widely popular, and used for many ailments and conditions.

Dry-water Hydro massage 

A variant of water massage (Hydrotherapy) that is still around today is the dry water massage. The dry water variants (found under multiple brand names and styles) can be found at casinos, shopping malls, some gymnasiums, beauty salons, and spas, as well as a few specialty locations. Many retailers also offer home installations of various types to meet individual needs.

The various Dry-Water Hydrotherapy units consist of a bed-like or bed-like design. The user lies down on, or sits in, the waterproof material barrier, while still completely clothed.  Underneath this protective barrier is a system of various water jets, that utilize different pressures, temperature, and speed settings to massage the body in a noninvasive manner.  Dry Water Massage is often utilized with goals of increasing blood circulation, decreasing pain, and reducing inflammation, by combining the various effects of hydrotherapy, massage therapy, acupressure, thermotherapy, soft tissue massage, and trigger point therapy. 
    
Before using any form of Hydro Massage, especially Dry water Hydro Massage, it is important to consult a physician to ensure that no health risks are involved.

Hydromassage methods 
There are many hydro massage methods, for instance, there is underwater manual massage, jet massage in the air, high-pressure water massage, hydromassage machines, etc.

Benefits of hydromassage
Hydromassage creates awareness of the body, reduces anxiety levels, gives a sense of well-being, improves the ability to monitor stress signals, and gives a feeling of peace of mind. It also helps to alleviate discomfort caused by pregnancy, provides with a relaxed state of mental alertness, helps treat athletic or job related injuries, relieves tension-related headaches, and can aid with post-operative rehabilitation.

Access to hydromassage
There are multiple ways to access a hydro massage. Users can procure the physical unit from a manufacturer for home use as an example.  Some units set up are in malls. Some chiropractors also have procured these units to provide as a service to their customers. A few specialty massage and wellness centers also carry these units. Units are also purchased and installed in tanning salons, gyms and spas.  Additionally, units can be transported on-site to companies and for special events.

See also
 Massage
 Vibromassage
 Honey massage
 Cup massage
 Cryomassage
 Hydrotherapy
 Jacuzzi
 Swan neck duct
 Mayo Clinic

References

External links

 Mayo Clinic Hydromassage Therapy Beds

H
Spas